Raphael Berdugo (Meknes in 1747 – 1821), a son of Rabbi Mordecai Berdugo, was a dayan, a scholar, and an influential Moroccan rabbi.

Berdugo was respected by his contemporaries, and his decisions continue to be a source of inspiration to Moroccan rabbis. His peers saw him as an excellent speaker with a great natural authority, who did not shirk from conflict with the notables, pointing out for example their inconsideration for yeshiva students.  He did not limit himself to his role as a dayan (judge), but was a community activist.  Berdugo made the shohatim abandon their old customs and follow the Castilian customs.  He also introduced reforms in the laws of inheritance, for example the inheritance of a husband and children in case of the death of a wife.

Berdugo had a number of adversaries.  One of them was Rabbi Baruch Toledano.  Their controversies were quite heated and have remained famous.

Berdugo is listed as a saint in Culte des Saints et Pélerinages Judéo-Musulmans au Maroc, and Rabbi Raphael married a daughter of the Mashbir and had four sons.

Publications
List of publications by Raphael Berdugo, some unpublished, and some published by Rabbi Chalom Messas:

 Torot Emet - on the four sections of Shulhan Aruch (Meknes 1939) - HebrewBooks.org
 Me Menouhot - homiletics on the Pentateuch, in two volumes (Jerusalem 1905) - HebrewBooks.org (I), HebrewBooks.org (II)
 Rav Peninim
 Messamehe Lev
 Mishpatim Yesharim - responsa, in two volumes (Kraków 1891) - HebrewBooks.org
 Sharvit Ha'Zahav - novellae on various Talmudic tractates, in two volumes (Jerusalem 1975) - HebrewBooks.org (II)

See also 

 Salomon Berdugo

References

External links
Family tree for ancestors and descendants

1747 births
1821 deaths
18th-century Moroccan rabbis
Moroccan writers
People from Meknes
19th-century Moroccan rabbis